Louise Bellocq, real name Marie-Louise Boudât, (20 January 1919, Charleville-Mézières – 25 August 1999) was a 20th-century French woman of letters born in a family of Béarn origin. She was awarded the Prix Fémina in 1960.

Biography 
Before the Second World War, she published three volumes of verse under her real name. She returned to settle in Pau in the family home after setbacks of fortune, and held a boarding house. In 1955, she published a novel, La Ferme de l'Ermitage, the first version of which was written for a contest organized by La Semaine de Suzette read by her daughter. She also wrote children's books. In 1960, she won the Prix Fémina for La Porte retombée.

The awarding of this literary prize led to severe criticism of Beatrix Beck, but Louise Bellocq was defended by Dominique Rolin, and Beatrix Beck presented her resignation from the jury.

Works 
 1952: Le Passager de la Belle aventure
 1955: La Ferme de l'ermitage
 1960: La Porte retombée, Éditions Gallimard, Prix Femina
 1963: Mesdames Minnigan
 1964: Conte de mes bêtes sous la Lune
 1968: Conte de mes bêtes à l'aventure

References

External links 
 La Porte retombée on  Sens critique
 Confidences de gargouille par Béatrix Beck
 Louise Bellocq on Gallimard

20th-century French non-fiction writers
20th-century French women writers
Prix Femina winners
People from Charleville-Mézières
1919 births
1960s deaths